Election of the Speaker of the Chamber of Deputies of the Parliament of the Czech Republic will be held on 20 November 2017.

Background
Legislative election was held on 20 and 21 October 2017. ANO 2011 have won plurality of 78 seats. Civic Democratic Party emerged as the second largest party with 25 seats. On 22 October 2017, ANO 2011 announced that it would nominate Radek Vondráček as the Speaker of the Chamber. On 23 October 2017, Freedom and Direct Democracy agreed to support Vondráček. Both parties have 100 seats of 200.

On 24 October 2017, the Civic Democratic Party announced it would nominate Petr Fiala as its candidate. On 25 October 2017, Czech Pirate Party announced it would most likely support Vondráček. TOP 09 announced it wouldn't support Vondráček.

On 31 October 2017, Miroslav Kalousek the leader of TOP 09 called parties to vote for neither of 2 candidates and to jam up the Chamber. This would prevent Andrej Babiš from becoming prime minister.

Fiala withdrawn from the election on 15 November 2017 because Vondráček had support of Pirates and SPD.

On 22 November 2017, Vondráček was elected the Speaker. He received 135 votes. 14 votes were against and 46 blank.

Candidates
Petr Fiala, leader of the Civic Democratic Party. Jan Zahradil stated that Fiala's candidacy is to show him as the leader of right-wing opposition.
Radek Vondráček, nominee of ANO 2011. On 29 October 2017 Pirates announced they would vote for Vondráček.

References

2017 elections in the Czech Republic
2017
November 2017 events in Europe
2017 Czech legislative election